The City Hall in East Liverpool, Ohio is part of the East Liverpool Central Business District multiple resource area (MRA). It was added to the National Register of Historic Places on November 14, 1985.

East Liverpool's City Hall was built in 1934 as a project of the Civil Works Administration. Stylistically, the building is an example of Art Deco architecture that was prominent in the 1930s. The two-story structure is constructed with sandstone.

References

City and town halls on the National Register of Historic Places in Ohio
Art Deco architecture in Ohio
Government buildings completed in 1934
Buildings and structures in Columbiana County, Ohio
National Register of Historic Places in Columbiana County, Ohio
East Liverpool, Ohio
City and town halls in Ohio
1934 establishments in Ohio